"Plain Brown Wrapper" is a song co-written and recorded by American country music artist Gary Morris.  It was released in February 1987 as the second single and title track from the album Plain Brown Wrapper.  The song reached #9 on the Billboard Hot Country Singles & Tracks chart.  Morris wrote the song with Kevin Welch.

Chart performance

References

1987 singles
Gary Morris songs
Songs written by Kevin Welch
Warner Records singles
Songs written by Gary Morris
1987 songs